Our Love may refer to:

Music
 Our Love, a 2021 song from the Arcane soundtrack by Curtis Harding and Jazmine Sullivan
 Our Love (Caribou album), 2014
 Our Love (Twins album), 2007
 "Our Love" (1939 song), a song by Larry Clinton, Buddy Bernier and Bob Emmerich
 "Our Love" (Natalie Cole song), 1977
 "(Our Love) Don't Throw It All Away", a 1978 song by Andy Gibb
 "Our Love", a 2022 song by Coheed and Cambria from the album Vaxis – Act II: A Window of the Waking Mind
 "Our Love", a 1979 song by Donna Summer
 "Our Love", an unreleased song by Drake Bell
 "Our Love", a song by Editors from In Dream
 "Our Love", a song by Incubus from Trust Fall (Side B)
 "Our Love", a song by Krokus from The Blitz
 "Our Love", a 1994 song by Matt Bianco
 "Our Love", a 1985 song by Michael McDonald from No Lookin' Back
 "Our Love", a song by Rhett Miller

Film
 Our Love (film), a 2000 Hungarian film

Our Love is also contained within:

 Our Love to Admire, the full title of an album by Interpol
 "Where Did Our Love Go", the full title of a song by The Supremes

See also
 "Cinta Kita" (Indonesian for "Our Love"), a 1995 song by Nike Ardilla